Hsieh Ling-ling (born on 20 September 1956) is a Taiwanese-born child star and the ex-wife of Hong Kong billionaire Peter Lam.

Biography 
She starred in five movies from 1977 to 1979, later returning to acting under the name Ling Tse. She appears in The New Heaven Sword and Dragon Sabre (1986), as well as the TV show Requiem of Ling Sing (1989).  Her work in the 1977 film Tiger & Crane Fists was re-used in the 2002 film Kung Pow: Enter the Fist, which consists mostly of archive material from the earlier film.

Personal life 
In 1980, Hsieh married Hong Kong billionaire Peter Lam. The couple had 5 children – Lester, Emily, Evelyn, Eleanor and Lucas, where Eleanor and Lucas are mixed twins. And Hsieh got on very well with her parents-in-law Lim Por-yen and U Po-chu. But the couple divorced in 1995. From her marriage to Peter Lam, Hsieh has a step-daughter named Lyann.

Filmography
 Orchids and My Love (1966)
 Shao Lin hu ho chen tien hsia   The Savage Killers (USA) a.k.a. Tiger & Crane Fists (1977)
 Yue meng long niao meng long (1978)
 Story in the Temple Red Lily (1979)
 The Wild Goose on the Wing (1979)
 Du mei gui yu da bao biao a.k.a. Poison Rose and The Bodyguard (1979)
 Kung Pow: Enter the Fist (2002)

References

External links

Living people
1956 births
Taiwanese child actresses
Taiwanese film actresses
Taiwanese television actresses
Taiwanese women in business
Hong Kong people of Taiwanese descent